Dariush Forouhar (1928 – 21 November 1998) was an Iranian pan-Iranist politician and leader of Nation Party of Iran.

Early life
Forouhar was born in Isfahan. His father was a general in the Army who was arrested in WW2 by the British during the Anglo-Soviet invasion of Iran after attempting to form an armed resistance.

Career and political activities
According to Ali Razmjoo in Hezb-e-Pan-Iranist, Forouhar was one of the founding members of the original nationalist Pan-Iranist Party of Iran in 1951 with Mohsen Pezeshkpour. During the Pahlavi era, he had been very active in the anti-Shah nationalist movement and was a strong supporter and close friend of the Prime Minister Mohammad Mossadegh. In the midst of post-revolutionary tensions in Iranian Kurdistan in 1979, Forouhar was part of a delegation sent by Tehran to negotiate with Kurdish political and religious leaders. Although this delegation's recommendations were never implemented by the central government and Kurdish revolt was dealt with harshly, Forouhar's attempts to reach a peaceful settlement with Kurds earned him respect among Kurds.

Forouhar served as minister of labor in the interim government of Mehdi Bazargan in 1979.

Death
Forouhar and his wife, Parvaneh Eskandari Forouhar, were overt opponents of Velayet-e-Faqih (clerical theocracy) and under continuous surveillance. They were assassinated in their home in 1998. The murders, which are believed to have been politically motivated, remain unsolved, although the general belief is that the Iranian Ministry of Intelligence was involved and had ordered the killings.
It is thought that the murders were provoked by Forouhar's criticism of human rights abuses by the Islamic Republic in interviews with Western radio stations that beamed Persian-language programs to Iran. This "brought them to the attention of Iran's ubiquitous intelligence service."

Under pressure from public opinion, the then Iranian president Mohammad Khatami formed a committee to follow up the case, which eventually asked for the resignation of the Minister of Intelligence, Ghorbanali Dorri-Najafabadi. One of the main characters behind the case, Saeed Emami, reportedly committed suicide while in prison.

Shirin Ebadi, the lawyer of the Forouhars' relatives quoting Parastou says: "All evidence shows that my father was preparing himself to go to prison, because at the time of his slaying, his shoes had no laces, he did not wear his wrist watch and had his wallet emptied of its contents and papers except for some money."

Their murders brought to light a pattern known as the chain murders of Iran.

Personal life
Forouhar had two children. Son, Arash, and daughter, Parastou, are both politically active and continue to raise awareness of the plight of political dissidents in Iran. In 2009, Parastou signed an open letter of apology posted to Iranian.com along with 266 other Iranian academics, writers, artists, journalists about the persecution of Baháʼís.

References

External links 

 
 English Page dedicated to Foruhars

1928 births
1998 deaths
Assassinated Iranian politicians
Government ministers of Iran
Politicians from Isfahan
People murdered in Iran
Iranian democracy activists
Nation Party of Iran politicians
National Front (Iran) politicians
Burials at Behesht-e Zahra
Candidates in the 1980 Iranian presidential election
Pan-Iranist Party politicians
Secretaries-General of political parties in Iran
Iranian nationalists